The Journal of Comparative Economics is a quarterly peer-reviewed academic journal published by Elsevier on behalf of the Association for Comparative Economic Studies. It was established in 1977 and the editors-in-chief are Ruben Enikolopov (Pompeu Fabra University), Timur Kuran (Duke University), and Hongbin Li (Stanford University).

External links

Economics journals
English-language journals
Elsevier academic journals
Quarterly journals
Publications established in 1977